Marie-Élisabeth Gabiou, née Lemoine (1761 – c. 1811) was a French painter.

Gabiou was the sister of painters Marie-Denise Villers and Marie-Victoire Lemoine, and was the sister-in-law and cousin of Jeanne-Elisabeth Chaudet; her husband, whom she married in 1789, was Chaudet's brother Jean-Frédéric Gabiou. Her work is usually signed "Eli Lemoine" or "Elith Lemoine", and her name is easily mistaken for that of Élisabeth Lemoine, née Bouchet. She has been described as a pastellist, though no pastels are known to exist by her hand. A supposed self-portrait appeared at auction through Christie's in 2010, realizing a price of €17,500.

References

1761 births
1810s deaths
Year of death uncertain
18th-century French painters
18th-century French women artists
19th-century French painters
19th-century French women artists